The 1992 Marshall Thundering Herd football team represented Marshall University as a member of the Southern Conference (SoCon) during the 1992 NCAA Division I-AA football season. Led by third-year head coach Jim Donnan, the Thundering Herd compiled an overall record of 12–3 with a mark of 5–2 in conference play, placing in a three-way tie for second in the SoCon. Marshall advanced to the NCAA Division I-AA Championship playoffs, where they beat  in the first round, Middle Tennessee State in the quarterfinals, and Delaware and Youngstown State in the NCAA Division I-AA Championship Game to win the program's first national championship. The team  played home games at Marshall University Stadium in Huntington, West Virginia.

Schedule

Roster

Team players drafted in the NFL
The following players were selected in the 1993 NFL Draft.

Awards and honors
 Michael Payton, Walter Payton Award

References

Marshall
Marshall Thundering Herd football seasons
NCAA Division I Football Champions
Marshall Thundering Herd football